The following is a list of episodes for the television series Kamen Rider: Dragon Knight. Some episodes (due to premiere in August 2009 in North America) were aired a month early on Brazilian channel Rede Globo program TV Globinho. Televisa in Mexico finished the series a month before The CW4Kids did, due to it airing three times a week there.

Episodes

References

External links
 Official 4Kids episode page
 Official 4Kids episode page
 Adness Entertainment
 Kamen Rider Productions

Lists of American action television series episodes
Dragon Knight
Lists of American children's television series episodes
Lists of American fantasy television series episodes